Uluberia  is a  railway station on the Howrah–Kharagpur line and is located in Howrah district in the Indian state of West Bengal.  It serves Uluberia.

History
The Howrah–Kharagpur line was opened in 1900.

Tracks
The Howrah–Panskura stretch has three lines.

Electrification
The Howrah–Kharagpur line was electrified in 1967–69.

References

External links
  Trains at Uluberia

Railway stations in Howrah district
Kharagpur railway division
Kolkata Suburban Railway stations